Túpac Amaru (1545–1572) was the last indigenous leader of the Inca empire.

Túpac Amaru may also refer to:
 Túpac Amaru II (1742–1781), Peruvian leader of an indigenous uprising
 Túpac Amaru Revolutionary Movement, a Peruvian communist guerrilla group
 Tupac Amaru Hunter (born 1973), Michigan politician
 Tupac Amaru Shakur (1971–1996), American rapper

See also
 Tupamaros, a Uruguayan communist guerrilla group
 Tupamaro (Venezuela), a political party of Venezuela until 2007
 Tupac (name), a given name (and list of people with that name)